The Tea Mountain Bamboo Forest Cup 2018 Yongchuan International Tournament was the 4th edition of the Yongchuan International Tournament, an invitational women's football tournament held in Yongchuan District, Chongqing, China.

Participants
In September 2018, the participants were announced.

Venues

Standings

Match results
All times are local, CST (UTC+8).

Statistics

References 

2018 in women's association football
2018
2018 in Chinese football
October 2018 sports events in China
2018 in Chinese women's sport